Kathmandu University School of Medical Sciences (KUSMS) is one of the seven schools of Kathmandu University running medical, nursing and allied health science program. KUSMS is a collaborative program of Kathmandu University and Dhulikhel Hospital. The main office of KUSMS is on the premises of Dhulikhel Hospital, a Kathmandu University hospital, in Kavrepalanchok District, Nepal. KUSMS was set up in 1994. Manipal College of Medical Sciences in Pokhara was the first medical college to be granted affiliation. Since then, KUSMS has granted affiliation to several medical colleges around the country.

KUSMS formally started its own medical training program, the MBBS program, on 7 September 2001 in association with Dhulikhel Hospital. The first class was 43 Nepali students. The day is annually celebrated as KUSMS Day. Although the medical school is still widely known as KUMS, inside and outside the country, its name was changed to Kathmandu University School of Medical Sciences (KUSMS) in 2006, in view of the fact that it not only trains medical undergraduates and postgraduates, but also runs nursing and allied health science programs.

In 2018, the total tuition for the MBBS degree was Rs. 3.7 million (USD $31,672) making the school one of the cheapest institutions to get a degree.

Aims and objectives
The school is a non-profit organization with a motto of producing "technically competent and socially responsible" doctors and other medical and nursing professionals. The main focus of the organization is to contribute in improving the overall health status of Nepal.

Courses
KUSMS runs the following programs:
 MBBS
 Bachelor of Dental Surgery
 BSc Human Biology
 BSc. Nursing (four years)
 BSc. Nursing in Midwifery
   Bachelor of Nursing Sciences (BNS)- Three and half years course
 Bachelor of Physiotherapy (BPT) – Four and half years course
 Certificate in Nursing under Dhulikhel Medical Institute
 Postgraduate program in basic and clinical sciences
 DM and MCh program in Cardiology, Neurology, Nephrology, Cardiothoracic and Neurosurgery in affiliated college.

The duration of the MBBS program is five and a half years of medical education. This includes one year of clinical internship. The first two years consists of learning basic science courses, where special emphasis is laid on problem-based and community-oriented learning. In the ensuing two and a half years, the medical students are taught and trained in clinical disciples. The students complete a year of clinical internship in clinical departments as well as in remote outreach health centers before the final medical diploma is issued by the university.

Administration
 Vice Chancellor: Prof. Dr. Bhola Thapa
 Dean: Prof. Dr. Rajendra Koju
 Associate Dean C.P.: Dr. Ramesh Makaju
 Chief Administrative Officer/Administrative Director (DH): Dr. Ramesh Makaju
 Associate Dean Affiliation and External P.G. Program: Dr. Dipak Shrestha
 Hospital Administration: Pradhumna Deoju Shrestha
 Manager- School Administration: Deepak Dahal

Colleges granted affiliation by KUSMS to run MBBS courses

Manipal College of Medical Sciences, Pokhara
Kathmandu Medical College, Kathmandu
Nepal Medical College, Kathmandu
Nepalgunj Medical College, Nepalgunj, Kohalpur, Chisapani
College of Medical Sciences, Bharatpur 10
Nobel Medical College, Biratnagar
Lumbini Medical College, Palpa
Birat medical college, Biratnagar
Devdaha medical college, Bhairhawa

College granted affiliation by KUSMS to run BDS courses
Kantipur Dental College, Kathmandu
Nobel Medical College, Biratnagar
Nepal Medical College, Kathmandu
Kathmandu Medical College, Kathmandu
College of Medical Sciences, Bharatpur

Colleges granted affiliation by KUSMS to run BSc. Nursing courses
Scheer Memorial Hospital, College of Nursing, Banepa
Kathmandu Medical College, Kathmandu
Manipal College of Medical Sciences, Pokhara
College of Medical Sciences, Bharatpur
Nobel Medical College, Biratnagar tinpaini, morang
Lumbini Medical College, Palpa

Recent developments

On the central campus run as KUSMS/DH Collaboration, the 13 batch of MBBS students have graduated from the medical school and the 14th batch is on internship. The 18th batch of students joined the medical school (October 2018). The students of the 15th batch are on final year of the course and waiting for final exam to appear, while the 16th have completed the basic science university examination. Similarly from BDS, 3rd batch students have graduated and 4th batch is on internship. The students from 6th Batch are on 4th year and are studying still on this lockdown.

Criticism and Controversies
Medical education in Nepal is highly controversial as many qualified students are turned away in lieu of competitive marks. Corruption is rampant with schools accepting students based on connections to established figures or illicit donations made to the school. The "hidden" tuition, as it's referred, is the additional cost of bribing officials in the education and healthy ministry with some students paying triple the tuition fees for enrollment.

Dr. Govinda KC is a staunch supporter of medical education reform in Nepal and has long advocated to break the education "mafia" present in the system.

See also
 Kathmandu University
 Dhulikhel Hospital

References

External links
The official website

Universities and colleges in Nepal
Education in Kathmandu
Educational institutions established in 1894
Medical colleges in Nepal
1894 establishments in Nepal
Organisations associated with Kathmandu University